William "Bill" Lustig (born February 1, 1955, in The Bronx, New York) is an American film director and producer who has worked primarily in the horror film genre.  He is the nephew of former middleweight champion Jake LaMotta.

Film career
As a film director, Lustig is best known for his low-budget horror films Maniac, Vigilante, Uncle Sam, and the Maniac Cop series. Lustig has also worked as an actor playing small roles in his own films as well as in films by Sam Raimi, most notably as a fake shemp in Army of Darkness and a dockworker in Darkman. As of 2009, Lustig is the CEO of Blue Underground; an entertainment company specializing in the release of obscure films and exploitation films on DVD. He also produced a remake of his film Maniac (2012) and is rumoured to be producing a new upcoming Maniac Cop with Nicolas Winding Refn.

Selected filmography

References

External links

1955 births
Horror film directors
Living people
People from the Bronx
American people of Italian descent
Film directors from New York City